LMS diesel shunters 7059–7068  were 0-6-0 diesel-electric shunters built by Armstrong Whitworth in 1936. Maker's numbers D54-D63. The diesel engine was an Armstrong-Sulzer 6LTD22 of 350 bhp at 875 rpm (400 bhp at 1,000 rpm on overload). There was a single Crompton Parkinson traction motor with a rating of 231 hp (continuous) or 358 hp (one hour). Final drive was by double reduction gears of 11.1:1 ratio and jackshafts.  These locomotives were similar in appearance to LMS 7080–7119 (which became British Rail Class D3/7) although the internal equipment was different.  They started work in 1936 and were allocated to Crewe South (7059–7063) and Kingmoor (7064–7068).

War Department use
All ten locomotives were requisitioned by the War Department in 1940–1941 and some were sent abroad to France, the Netherlands, Belgium or Egypt. The four sent to Egypt were numbered MEF19–MEF22 (MEF = Middle East Forces) but, in 1944, they were re-numbered 70019–70022. The other six retained their LMS numbers until 1944 when they received WD numbers 70213–70218.

Individual histories
History of the locomotives during, and after, World War II is complex, because they were so widely scattered. It is necessary to describe them individually:

LMS 7059
Served in France and Belgium. WD number 70213. Given unofficial name "Old Joe". Later bought by SNCB and numbered 230.001. Withdrawn March 1958.

LMS 7060
Served in Egypt. WD numbers MEF19, 70019. Withdrawn 1945 and "canalised" at Suez. This presumably means it was dumped in the Suez canal so it might still be there, although it would be heavily corroded.

LMS 7061
Served in France, Belgium and the Netherlands. WD number 70214. Given unofficial name "Pluto". Later bought by SNCB and numbered 231.101. Withdrawn February 1965.

LMS 7062
Remained in the UK. WD number 70215. Given unofficial name "Flying Scotsman". Re-numbered 882 in 1952. Transferred to British Army of the Rhine by 1958. Sold 1959 to LKW-Union Dortmund. Disposal unknown.

LMS 7063
Remained in the UK. WD number 70216. Re-numbered 883 in 1952. Used at Cairnryan Military Railway and Bicester Depot. Sold to E. L. Pitts Ltd, Brackley, August 1963. Lent to Central Electricity Generating Board and used at Hams Hall Power Station 1966. Later scrapped.

LMS 7064
Served in France, Belgium and the Netherlands. WD number 70217. Given unofficial name "Ubique" (Latin for "everywhere" and the motto of the Corps of Royal Engineers). Later bought by SNCB and numbered 231.102. Withdrawn May 1961.

LMS 7065
Served in Egypt. WD numbers MEF20, 70020. Taken into Egyptian State Railways stock c. 1954 as number 4022. Disposal unknown.

LMS 7066
Served in Egypt. WD numbers MEF21, 70021. Withdrawn 1945. Scrapped 1951–2.

LMS 7067
Served in France and Belgium. WD number 70218. Later bought by SNCB and numbered 231.103. Withdrawn January 1966.

LMS 7068
Served in Egypt. WD numbers MEF22, 70022. Taken into Egyptian State Railways stock as number 4021. Disposal unknown.

See also
 LMS diesel shunters

References

 
 

7059
Diesel shunter 7059
War Department locomotives
Armstrong Whitworth locomotives
C locomotives
Railway locomotives introduced in 1936
Standard gauge locomotives of Great Britain
Diesel-electric locomotives of Great Britain